Sir William Lemon, 1st Baronet (11 October 1748 – 11 December 1824) was a Member of Parliament for Cornish constituencies from 1770 to 1824, a total of 54 years.

Background
He was the son of William Lemon and Anne, the daughter of John Willyams of Carnanton House and the grandson of William Lemon (1696–1760), who acquired the family estate at Carclew in 1749.

Lemon's younger brother John (1754–1814) became a Member of Parliament for Saltash and Truro  and was the owner of Pollevillan. John Lemon died on 5 April 1814.

His sister Anne married John Buller MP for Exeter and West Looe.

Education
He was educated at Christ Church, Oxford and with a Grand Tour.

Parliamentary service
He was Member of Parliament for Penryn 1770–1774 and Cornwall 1774–1824, a total of 54 years.

He was created Baronet Lemon of Carclew, Cornwall on 24 May 1774.

Marriage
He married Jane, the eldest daughter of James Buller, MP for Cornwall and his wife Jane, who was eldest daughter of Allen Bathurst, 1st Earl Bathurst.  Jane Lemon died 17 June 1823.

Children
SOURCE: Debrett's Baronetage 1839.
Anne, married Sir John Davie in 1796.
Maria married Francis Jodrell in 1807.
William born 1774 died 1799.
Louisa, married Lt. Col. George Hart Dyke in 1802. She died in 1839.
Harriet, married Francis Basset, 1st Baron de Dunstanville and Basset in 1824. She died 30 December 1864.
John, born 1779 died young.
Emma
Frances
Isabella Jane married her cousin Anthony Buller in 1805
Charles, 2nd Baronet
Tryphena-Octavia – died young
Caroline Matilda married John Hearle Tremayne in 1818

Death and succession
He died on 11 December 1824 and was succeeded in his baronetcy by his son Charles Lemon (1784–1868).

References

1748 births
1824 deaths
Politicians from Cornwall
Alumni of Christ Church, Oxford
Baronets in the Baronetage of Great Britain
Members of the Parliament of Great Britain for Penryn
British MPs 1768–1774
British MPs 1774–1780
British MPs 1780–1784
British MPs 1784–1790
British MPs 1790–1796
British MPs 1796–1800
Members of the Parliament of the United Kingdom for Cornwall
UK MPs 1801–1802
UK MPs 1802–1806
UK MPs 1806–1807
UK MPs 1807–1812
UK MPs 1812–1818
UK MPs 1818–1820
UK MPs 1820–1826
Members of the Parliament of Great Britain for Cornwall